St. Johann im Pongau (Saiga Håns or Sainig Håns in the local Pongau dialect, abbreviated St.Johann/Pg.) is a small city in the state of Salzburg in Austria. It is the administrative centre of the St. Johann im Pongau District.

Geography

The city is located in the Salzach Valley of the Eastern Alps, between the Salzburg Slate Alps in the north, the Radstadt Tauern (part of the Niedere Tauern range) in the southeast and the Ankogel Group (Hohe Tauern) in the southwest. 

The city lies in the centre of the Salzburg Pongau region. The municipal area comprises the cadastral communities of Ginau,  Hallmoos, Maschl, Einöden, Plankenau, Reinbach, Rettenstein, St. Johann, and Urreiting.

Due to its picturesque setting, the area largely depends on tourism, Alpine skiing in winter and hiking in the summer months. A dramatic gorge called Liechtensteinklamm lies south of the city.

History
The Salzach Valley, an ancient copper mining area, has been settled at least since the Bronze Age. The settlement was first mentioned as sanctum Johannem in villa in a 1074 deed, named after John the Baptist. For centuries, it was a possession held by the Prince-Archbishops of Salzburg.

In the course of the German Peasants' War of 1525/26, large parts of the population became Protestant. Under the rule of Prince-Archbishop Count Leopold Anton von Firmian in 1731, numerous inhabitants (called Exulanten) were forced to leave the country. Many of them found refuge in the Kingdom of Prussia, choosing to settle in East Prussia (Gumbinnen).

In 1939, during the Austrian Anschluss to Nazi Germany, St. Johann was renamed Markt Pongau and from 1941 was the site of the World War II Stalag  XVIII C (317) internment camp run by the Wehrmacht armed forces. Mainly French and Red Army POWs were interred here. About 4,000 Soviet inmates were killed or succumbed to the conditions of their detention. A 'Russian Cemetery' and a monument to this camp are located on the north end of the city.

About 20km north of St. Johann, a small portion of a picnic scene from The Sound of Music was filmed on a hillside, in the Pongau city of Werfen. Julie Andrews and crew filmed the opening shots of the "Do-Re-Mi" sequence with the Burg Hohenwerfen in the background. Werfen was also the location for some filming of Where Eagles Dare.

On 24 June 2000 St. Johann completed the Stadtserhebung process and received official city privileges from the Austrian government.

Personalities

 Gerald Mild (born 1962), tennis player
 Petra Kronberger (born 1969), skier
 Iris Strubegger (born 1984), model
 Joachim Puchner (born 1987), skier
 Mirjam Puchner (born 1992), skier

References

External links

Gallery 

St. Johann im Pongau District
Cities and towns in St. Johann im Pongau District